The Táin is an album by Irish rock band Horslips. Their second studio album, it was Horslip's first attempt at making a concept album, an idea they would return to in 1976 with The Book of Invasions: A Celtic Symphony. The Táin was based on the Táin Bó Cúailnge (The Cattle Raid of Cooley), one of the most infamous legends of Early Irish literature, dealing with the war between Ulster and Connacht over a prize bull. The songs tell the story from the points of view of Cúchulainn, Queen Maeve of Connacht and Ferdia, among others. Horslips continued their Celtic Rock style of fusing traditional Irish music and rock, using traditional jigs and reels and incorporating them into their songs. For example, Dearg Doom is based on O'Neill's March, while The March of the King of Laois forms part of "More Than You Can Chew".

The Táin was released in Ireland in 1973 independently, in the UK by RCA/Oats and by Atco in the US. It was reissued in the UK in 1978 by DJM.

"Dearg Doom" was arguably the most popular track on the album and was included in Tom Dunne's 30 Best Irish Hits compilation, released in 2003. Along with "Faster Than The Hound", it was performed by the band on BBC's Old Grey Whistle Test. "Dearg Doom's" main guitar riff was incorporated into "Put 'Em Under Pressure", the anthem of the Republic of Ireland's Italia '90 campaign, reintroducing the song to a younger audience.

Track listing

Personnel 
Horslips
 Jim Lockhart - keyboards, flute, tin whistles, uilleann pipes, backing vocals
 Eamon Carr - drums, bodhrán, percussions
 Barry Devlin - bass guitar, lead vocals on "Charolais," "You Can't Fool the Beast," "Ferdia's Song," and "Faster than The Hound," backing vocals
 Charles O'Connor - fiddle, mandolin, concertina, lead vocals on "Dearg Doom," "Cú Chulainn's Lament," and "More than You Can Chew," backing vocals
 John Fean - guitars, banjo, lead vocals on "Time to Kill," backing vocals

References

Sources 
 Horslips official site - Gives lyrics, meanings of songs, as well as a guide to the album's backstory, the legendary Táin Bó Cuailgne.

Horslips albums
1973 albums
Concept albums